The South Branch of the Sugar River is a  river located in western New Hampshire in the United States. It is a tributary of the Sugar River, which flows to the Connecticut River, which flows to Long Island Sound.

The South Branch begins at the confluence of Gunnison Brook and Blood Brook at the center of the town of Goshen, New Hampshire. The river flows north, reaching the Sugar River near the center of the town of Newport. New Hampshire Route 10 follows the South Branch for its entire length.

See also

List of rivers of New Hampshire

References

Rivers of New Hampshire
Tributaries of the Connecticut River
Rivers of Sullivan County, New Hampshire